Psychiatry Research is a peer-reviewed medical journal covering psychiatry. It was established in 1979 and is published 21 times per year by Elsevier. A section of the journal, Psychiatry Research: Neuroimaging, covers the discipline of neuroimaging as it pertains to psychiatry. The editor-in-chief is Lynn DeLisi. According to the Journal Citation Reports, the journal has a 2021 impact factor of 11.225.

References

External links

Psychiatry journals
Elsevier academic journals
Publications established in 1979
English-language journals